This is a list of sheriffs and since 1974 high sheriffs of Cambridgeshire'''.

The Sheriff is the oldest secular office under the Crown.  Formerly the Sheriff was the principal law enforcement officer in the county but over the centuries most of the responsibilities associated with the post have been transferred elsewhere or are now defunct, so that its functions are now largely ceremonial. Under the provisions of the Local Government Act 1972, on 1 April 1974 the office previously known as Sheriff was retitled High Sheriff.

Before 1154
Tempore Regis Eduardi: Aluric Godricson, Orgar, Blacuin
1066: Elfric
1070–c.1090: Picot of Cambridge
c.1110–1122: Gilbert
c.1125–1129: Fulk
Michaelmas 1129: Richard Basset with Aubrey de Vere
c.1133: Fulk
1140: Payn

From 1154 until 1635, appointees to the shrievalty held the joint office of Sheriff of Cambridgeshire and Huntingdonshire.

1636–1641
3 October 1636: Sir John Carleton, 1st Baronet, of Cheveley
30 September 1637: Sir Thomas Chicheley, of Wimpole Hall
4 November 1638: Sir Thomas Wendy, of Haslingfield
1639: Thomas Prichard, of Trumpington
1640: John Crane, of Kingston
1641: Sir John Cotton, 1st Baronet, of Landwade

From 1642 until 1965, appointees to the shrievalty held the joint office of Sheriff of Cambridgeshire and Huntingdonshire. From 1965 until 1974, sheriffs were Sheriff of Cambridgeshire and Isle of Ely.

1974–1999

1974: Michael Henry Tindall Carter of Paget Hall, Tydd St. Giles, Wisbech
1975: Kenneth Beaton
1976: Peter Boyton Taylor
1977: David Dring Morrell
1978: David Whittome
1979: George Edward McWatters
1980: George Simon Cecil Gibson, of Landwade Hall
1981: John Ray Horrell CBE TD
1982: David Owen Arthur Morbey
1983: Major William Birkbeck, of Bainton House
1984: Brigadier Alan Norman Breitmeyer
1985: John Sinclair Martin, CBE, of Denny Abbey, Waterbeach
1986: Dr Irwin Arthur William Peck MBE
1987: Sir Alexander James Reid, Bt
1988: Michael John Marshall
1989: Joseph Odam
1990: Nigel Stewart Elgood
1991: Hugh Duberly
1992: Godfrey Richard Warde Wright
1993 Elizabeth Anne, The Hon. Lady Hastings of Milton Hall, Peterborough
1994: Frederick James Grounds
1995: Margaret Elspeth Thomas
1996: Nigel Hugh Mosman Chancellor
1997: David Temple Ramply
1998: Richard Brian Bamford
1999: John Edwin Heading

2000–present

References

Bibliography
 (with amendments of 1963, Public Record Office)

 
Local government in Cambridgeshire
Cambridgeshire
High Sheriff